Suzanne Bianchetti (24 February 1889 – 17 October 1936) was a film actress.

Suzanne Bianchetti appeared in her first film in the early 1900s and quickly became one of France's most loved and respected actresses. She appeared as Marie Antoinette in Abel Gance's 1927 epic, Napoléon and worked with many of the early notables of the silent film era such as Antonin Artaud and the singer, Damia.

She was married to writer and actor René Jeanne (1887–1969) who served as the director of L'Etablissement Cinématographique des Armées.

Prix Suzanne Bianchetti

When Suzanne Bianchetti died in 1936 at the age of 47, the following year, her husband created an award in her memory to be given annually to the most promising young actress. It was given for the first time in 1937 to actress Junie Astor (1912–1967) for her performance in the film, Club de femmes. The award comes in the form of a medallion engraved with Suzanne Bianchetti's image. Since its inception, the Prix Suzanne Bianchetti has been awarded to many of the greatest names in French cinema who went on to national and international success, such as Micheline Presle, Simone Signoret, Annie Girardot, Geneviève Bujold, Audrey Tautou and Isabelle Adjani.

Partial filmography

Trois familles (1919, Short)
Sa gosse (1919)
Flipotte (1920)
La marseillaise (1920) - Lise de Dietrich
Une brute (1921)
Le rêve (1921)
Le père Goriot (1921)
The Mysteries of Paris (1922) - La marquise d'Harville
Jocelyn (1922) - Julie, la soeur de Jocelyn
The Courier of Lyon (1923) - Clotilde d'Argence
La légende de soeur Béatrix (1923) - Nilidor
Imperial Violets (1924) - Eugénie de Montijo
L'enfant des halles (1924) - Princesse Mila Serena
La flambée des rêves (1924) - Suzanne
L'heureuse mort (1925) - Lucie Larue
Madame Sans-Gêne (1925) - L'Impératrice Marie-Louise
La Brière (1925)
Le Nègre blanc (1925) - Suzanne
The Night Watch (1925) - Princesse Hedwig
Les Aventures de Robert Macaire (1925) - Louise de Sermèze
Napoléon (1927) - La reine Marie-Antoinette
The Loves of Casanova (1927) - Catherine II
Verdun, visions d'histoire (1928) - L'épouse
Kiss Me (1929) - Marquise Aurore
Cagliostro (1929) - Marie-Antoinette
Les Mufles (1929) - Laure Jantet
The Man Without Love (1929) - Duchesse de Rogall
Princes de la cravache (1930) - Mme d'Arbeiller
The King of Paris (1930) - Duchesse de Marsignac
Verdun, souvenirs d'histoire (1931) - La femme
The Mad Night (1932) - Clotilde
Imperial Violets (1932) - Eugénie de Montijo
Aux portes de Paris (1935)
Napoléon Bonaparte (1935) - Marie-Antoinette (uncredited)
The Call of Silence (1936) - La femme du monde (final film role)

External links

Suzanne Bianchetti at Virtual History

1889 births
1936 deaths
French stage actresses
French film actresses
French silent film actresses
French people of Italian descent
20th-century French actresses